Eupithecia incommoda is a moth in the  family Geometridae. It is found in Ethiopia.

References

Endemic fauna of Ethiopia
Moths described in 1983
incommoda
Insects of Ethiopia
Moths of Africa